Jonathan López (born 10 May 1988) is a Guatemalan football midfielder who plays for Iztapa.

He appeared in four matches of the Guatemala national football team for the 2011 CONCACAF Gold Cup.

References

1988 births
Living people
Guatemalan footballers
Guatemalan expatriate footballers
Guatemala international footballers
Association football midfielders
2011 CONCACAF Gold Cup players
2013 Copa Centroamericana players
Deportivo Marquense players
C.S.D. Municipal players
Antigua GFC players
Santos de Guápiles footballers
Xelajú MC players
C.D. Malacateco players
Liga Nacional de Fútbol de Guatemala players
Guatemalan expatriate sportspeople in Costa Rica
Expatriate footballers in Costa Rica